Vernacular comes from the Latin word vernaculus, which means "native" or "indigenous." Ideally, vernacular is the way ordinary people communicate with each other. In British India, the Vernacular Press Act (1878) was enacted to curtail the freedom of the Indian press and prevent the expression of criticism toward British policies—notably, the opposition that had grown with the outset of the Second Anglo-Afghan War (1878–80). The government adopted the Vernacular Press Act 1878 to regulate the indigenous press in order to manage strong public opinion and seditious writing producing unhappiness among the people of native region with the government. The Act was proposed by Lytton, then Viceroy of India, and was unanimously passed by the Viceroy's Council on 14 March 1878. The act excluded English-language publications as it was meant to control seditious writing in 'publications in Oriental languages' everywhere in the country, except for the South. Thus the British totally discriminated against the (non-English language) Indian Press.

The act empowered the government to impose restrictions on the press in the following ways:

1. Modelled on the Irish press act, this act provided the government with extensive rights to censor reports and editorials in the Vernacular press.

2. From now on the government kept regular track of Vernacular newspapers.

3. When a report published in the newspaper was judged as seditious, the newspaper was warned.

History
The press sometimes created a problem for the interests of the company. The first newspaper, Hicky's Bengal Gazette, was banned in 1782 because of criticisms of the East India Company. A later newspaper editor, William Duane (journalist) was deported. Due to the press's criticisms, Richard Wellesley, 1st Marquess Wellesley regulated the press in 1799, according to which the press had to get approval of the government before the publication of any manuscript including advertisements. During the Indian Rebellion of 1857, the "Gagging Act" had been passed by Lord Canning which sought to regulate the establishment of printing presses and to restrain the tone of all printed matter. All presses had to have a licence from the government, with distinction between publications in English and other regional languages. The Act also held that no printed material shall impugn the motives of the British Raj, tending to bring it hatred and contempt and exciting unlawful resistance to its orders. When the British Government found that the Gagging Act was not potent enough to repress all nationalist sentiments, it created a more forcible law, designed in part by Sir Alexander John Arbuthnot and Sir Ashley Eden, Lieutenant Governor of Bengal.

At the time the Vernacular Press Act was passed, there were thirty five vernacular papers in Bengal, including the Amrita Bazar Patrika, the editor of which was one Sisir Kumar Ghose. Sir Ashley Eden summoned him and offered to contribute to his paper regularly if he gave him final editorial approval. Ghose refused, and remarked that “there ought to be at least one honest journalist in the land.” The Vernacular Press Act might be said to have grown from this incident. About the time the Act was passed, Sir Ashley remarked in a speech that forty five seditious writings published in fifteen different vernacular papers were presented to him before the Act was finalized.

The Vernacular Press Act stated that any magistrate or Commissioner of Police had the authority to call upon any printer or publisher of a newspaper to enter into a bond, undertaking not to print a certain kind of material, and could confiscate any printed material it deemed objectionable. The Act provided for submitting to police all the proof sheets of contents of papers before publication. What was seditious news was to be determined by the police, and not by the judiciary. Under this Act many of the papers were fined, their editors jailed. Thus, they were subject to prior restraint. The affected party could not seek redress in a court of law. General threats to the Indian language press included:

 Subversion of democratic institutions
 Agitations and violent incidents
 False allegations against British authorities or individuals
 Endangering law and order to disturb the normal functioning of the state
 Threats to internal stability

Any one or more of the above were punishable by law, but no redress could be sought in any court in the land.

Reception
Because the British government was in a hurry to pass the bill without encouraging any reactions whatever, the bill was not published in the usual papers in Calcutta and the North-Western Provinces were the slowest in obtaining information. While the Amrita Bazar Patrika in Calcutta had converted itself into an all-English weekly within a week of the passing of the Vernacular Press Act, papers in the north were wondering what the exact provisions of the act were, even after two weeks of its existence. The following years saw the appearance and disappearance of a number of Bengali journals in quick succession, failing to gain support with their poverty of language and thought.

Once publishers learned of the provisions, the repressive measure encountered strong opposition. All the native associations irrespective of religion, caste and creed denounced the measure and kept their protests alive. All the prominent leaders as Bengal and India condemned the Act as unwarranted and unjustified, and demanded its immediate withdrawal. The newspapers themselves kept criticizing the measure without end. The succeeding administration of Lord Ripon reviewed the developments consequent upon the Act and finally withdrew it (1881). However, the resentment it produced among Indians helped fuel India's growing independence movement. The Indian Association, which is generally considered to be one of the precursors of the Indian National Congress, was one of the Act's biggest critics. The crucial demand for a judicial trial in case of an accusation of sedition against an editor was never conceded by the government. However, in October 1878 the act was modified in minor respect; the submission of proofs before publication was no longer insisted upon, although the bail-bond remained.

References

External links
 History of Indian Journalism, J.Natarajan, p. 81, 100–102, 108–112.
 Mass Media Laws and Regulations, C.S.Rayadu and S.B.Nageswar Rao, p. 1, 3–6,8-11.
 "Vernacular Press Act", Encyclopædia Britannica. On line.

Legislation in British India
Censorship in India
Media law
1878 in India
1878 in British law